Nauzet Fernández Herrera (born 22 April 1978), known simply as Nauzet, is a Spanish former footballer who played as a midfielder.

Club career
Nauzet was born in Santa Cruz de Tenerife, Canary Islands. An unsuccessful youth graduate at local CD Tenerife, he went on to play in both his country and Portugal, appearing for various clubs in the nations' second and third divisions.

Nauzet's professional career was spent at the service of CD Badajoz, S.C. Campomaiorense, F.C. Marco and S.C. Olhanense, totalling 53 games and three goals over the course of four seasons.

External links

1978 births
Living people
Spanish footballers
Footballers from Santa Cruz de Tenerife
Association football midfielders
Segunda División players
Segunda División B players
Tercera División players
CD Tenerife B players
Rayo Vallecano B players
CF Fuenlabrada footballers
CD Badajoz players
CE Sabadell FC footballers
Terrassa FC footballers
Liga Portugal 2 players
Segunda Divisão players
Sporting CP B players
S.C. Campomaiorense players
F.C. Marco players
S.C. Olhanense players
Spanish expatriate footballers
Expatriate footballers in Portugal
Spanish expatriate sportspeople in Portugal